Wheeling Historic District, also known as the Wheeling Central Business District, is a national historic district located at Wheeling, Ohio County, West Virginia. The district includes 205 contributing buildings in the central business district of Wheeling. It includes the site of the original location of Fort Henry.  The buildings are representative of a number of popular architectural styles from the early-19th century through the present including Greek Revival and Late Victorian. The District was listed on the National Register of Historic Places in 1979.

Contributing buildings in the district include:
 United States Custom House (1859)
 United States Courthouse, Custom House, and Post Office (1905)
 St. Matthew's Church and Rectory (c. 1892)
 Thomas Paull House (c. 1835)
 English Lutheran Church (1897) designed by Franzheim, Greisey, and Faris
 First United Presbyterian Church (1825)
 City Bank Building (c. 1890) also designed by Franzheim, Greisey, and Faris
 Bank of Wheeling (1892) also designed by Franzheim, Greisey, and Faris,
 Capitol Theatre (1928), designed by Charles W. Bates
 Medical Tower Building (1915)
 Joseph Speidel & Company Building

It also includes the West Virginia Independence Hall and Baltimore and Ohio Passenger Terminal (1907-1908), which are listed on the National Register of Historic Places as individual buildings.

References

External links
All of the following are located in Wheeling, Ohio County, WV:

National Register of Historic Places in Wheeling, West Virginia
Historic districts on the National Register of Historic Places in West Virginia
Greek Revival architecture in West Virginia
Historic districts in Wheeling, West Virginia